Sergei Denisov may refer to:

Sergei Denisov (ice hockey)
Sergei Denisov (aviator)